The 1980 Clemson Tigers football team was an American football team that represented Clemson University in the Atlantic Coast Conference (ACC) during the 1980 NCAA Division I-A football season. In its third season under head coach Danny Ford, the team compiled a 6–5 record (2–4 against conference opponents), tied for fourth place in the ACC, and was outscored by a total of 222 to 217. The team won the 100th ACC game in Clemson history on November 1 and played its home games at Memorial Stadium in Clemson, South Carolina.

Lee Nanney and Willie Underwood were the team captains. The team's statistical leaders included quarterback Homer Jordan with 1,311 passing yards, Chuck McSwain with 544 rushing yards, Perry Tuttle with 915 receiving yards, and placekicker Obed Ariri with 87 points scored (23 field goals, 18 extra points).

Schedule

Roster

References

Clemson
Clemson Tigers football seasons
Clemson Tigers football